Zârna may refer to the following rivers in Romania:
 Zârna (Râul Doamnei), in Argeș County
 Zârna, a tributary of the Drăgan in Cluj County
 Zârna Mare, a tributary of the Zăbala in Vrancea County
 Zârna Mică, a tributary of the Zăbala in Vrancea County